Pawtuxet Valley may be:

Pawtuxet Valley Dyeing Company
 Pawtuxet Valley Railroad